Bohemistics, also known as Czech studies, is the field of humanities that researches, documents and disseminates Czech language and literature in both its historic and present-day forms. The common Czech name for the field is bohemistika. A researcher in the field is usually called a "Bohemist".

Noted scholars 
 Josef Dobrovský
 Jan Gebauer
 Bohuslav Havránek
 Josef Jungmann
 Ernest Denis

See also
Bohemism
List of English words of Czech origin
Czech literature
Czech Republic
History of the Czech language

References

External links 
 Institute of Czech Studies, Faculty of Arts & Philosophy, Charles University in Prague

Historical linguistics
Czech language
Czech literature
Bohemistics
Slavic studies